Rick S. Miera (born July 20, 1951 in Albuquerque, New Mexico) is an American politician who served as a member of the New Mexico House of Representatives, representing the 11th District. Miera did not seek reelection in 2014.

Early life and education 
Miera was born and raised in Albuquerque, New Mexico. He earned a Bachelor of Arts and Bachelor of Science degree from the University of Albuquerque.

Career 
Miera worked as a consultant and therapist before retiring. Miera served as a member of the New Mexico House of Representatives from 1991 to 2014. During his tenure, he served as House Majority Leader. Upon his retirement, Miera was succeeded by attorney and activist, Javier Martínez.Miera announced his candidacy for Lieutenant Governor of New Mexico on June 12, 2017. In the Democratic primary, Miera placed second behind eventual winner, Howie Morales.

Personal life 
He is married to Bernadette Miera and has two children.

References

External links
 Representative Rick Miera at the New Mexico House of Representatives
 Rick S. Miera - Political Summary at Project Vote Smart

1951 births
Hispanic and Latino American state legislators in New Mexico
Living people
Democratic Party members of the New Mexico House of Representatives
Politicians from Albuquerque, New Mexico
University of Albuquerque alumni